Veeranna Somanna is an Indian politician who is the current minister of housing and Infrastructure Development department of Karnataka  from 4 August 2021. He is a Member of the Karnataka Legislative Assembly from Govindraj Nagara constituency from May 2018.

(On 10 June 2016, he was re-elected to the Karnataka Legislative Council. He secured 31 votes of BJP MLAs.)

Personal life 

Somanna was born on 20 July 1951 to Veeranna and Kempamma in Doddamaralavadi of Ramanagar district. He is married to Shailaja and has three children.

Positions held 
1983 - 1987: Elected to Bangalore Mahanagara Palike
1994 - MLA from Binnypet on Janata Dal ticket
1996 - 1999: Minister for Prisons, Minister for Bangalore Urban Development
1999 - Elected from Binnypet as an Independent
2004 - Elected for a third time on a Congress ticket
2008 - Elected from Govindarajan nagar on a Congress ticket
2010 - 2018: Member of Karnataka Legislative Council
2018–present: Elected for a second time on a BJP ticket
2019 - 2020: Minister of Horticulture and Sericulture
2021–present: Minister for Housing and Minister for Infrastructure and Development

References

Living people
Members of the Karnataka Legislative Council
Bharatiya Janata Party politicians from Karnataka
Karnataka MLAs 2018–2023
1950 births